RCI Banque SA, trading as Mobilize Financial Services and formerly known as RCI Bank and Services and as Renault Crédit International, is a France-based international company that is a wholly owned subsidiary of Renault.  RCI Banque specialises in automotive financing, insurance, and related activities for the Renault group brands (Renault, Renault Samsung Motors, Dacia, Lada and Alpine) globally for the Nissan group brands (Nissan, Infiniti, Datsun) in Europe, Russia, Asia and South America; and for Mitsubishi Motors in the Netherlands.

History
The company was founded by Renault in 1974 as the Société Financière de Renault or Sofiren, being intended as a way of financing sales for its dealerships and to manage the automaker's cash flow in Europe. On  27 June 1980 it was renamed Renault Crédit International (RCI). In 1990, it merged with Diac (Diffusion Industrielle et Automobile par le Crédit) SA, a company formed in 1924 by Louis Renault as a result of the lack of liquid funds after the 1921 crisis and with similar objectives, but focused exclusively on loans for the purchase of vehicles (today Diac operates as a RCI Banque's wholly owned subsidiary). By 1990, it contributed with more than one-third of Renault group's net income. In November 2001, the company was named RCI Banque. In February 2016, as part of a corporate image revamp, RCI Banque adopted the commercial name RCI Bank and Services. In January 2018, the firm moved its headquarters from Noisy-le-Roi to the 2nd arrondissement of Paris. The Noisy-le-Roi headquarters were kept by the subsidiary Diac. In February 2018, the firm's affiliate in the Netherlands announced it would finance Mitsubishi Motors sales in the country through a partnership with the local Mitsubishi financial affiliate.

In may 2022, RCI Bank and Services becomes Mobilize Financial Services.

Activities
Mobilize Financial Services offers  automobile financing lines (17.8 billion euros of new financing at the end of 2020, 4.6 million service contracts sold at the end of 2020 including insurance products). New financing contracts rose to €17.8 billion in 2020. The volume of services sold came to 4.6 million contracts.

In 2020, the firm recorded 1,520,330 contracts financed, generating new financings of €17.8 billion.

It  also offers related services, including car loans (used and brand-new), electric vehicle battery leasing contract (100,000 contract in March 2017), rentals with purchasing options, leases, long-term rentals for retail customers and services, such as maintenance, extended warranties, roadside assistance, fleet management, and credit cards.
 
It also finances new vehicles, used vehicles, and spare parts, as well as short-term cash requirements for the Renault–Nissan–Mitsubishi Alliance dealerships. It has subsidiaries in Argentina, Brazil, Colombia, Algeria, Morocco, Ukraine, South Korea, and the European Union and joint-ventures in Russia, Turkey and India.

The firm has developed online vehicle sales. In Brazil, 20% of the Renault KWID models sold in 2018 were booked online using RCI e-payment. Dacia customers in the United Kingdom have been able to finance and pay off the model of their choice entirely online since November 2018 via the Dacia Buy Online website. It is the first time that a fully digitalized customer experience has been proposed in the British market.    

In 2020, it sold 1.8 services per vehicle registered by the Alliance brands in its operating scope.

The firm is one of the largest issuers of auto loan asset-backed securities in Europe. In 2004, it had, together with the PSA Banque, a 10 percent participation, only behind Volkswagen and Fiat banks.

It continued to develop its e-payment offer in 2019. 400,000 transactions were realized by its customers via the RCI e-payment solution, up 27.4% compared to 2018.

In 2021, RCI Bank and Services achieved a group pre-tax profit of €1,194 million, up 19% compared to 2020. New financing amounts to 17.8 billion euros with a total of 1,415,841 contracts financed.

Acquisitions
RCI Bank and Services is  expanding its mobility operations. In January 2017 it became the majority shareholder of :fr:Karhoo a platform of integrated reservation which gathers companies of taxis and on-demand transportation .

In September 2017 it acquired Class and Co, the parent company of Yuso (an automated fleet management system for taxi, ride-hailing and delivery services) and Marcel (a platform for reserving ride-hailing services in the Paris metropolitan area).

On 8 June 2018 it acquired a 75% majority interest in iCabbi, a dispatch management company for automotive fleets of taxis and PHVs.

Innovations
RCI Bank and Services has joined “LaBChain”, a European banking-finance-insurance consortium dedicated to blockchain technology launched by the Caisse des Dépôts group.

In March 2018 it entered a partnership with Octo Telematics to  supply telematic services and thorough analyses of the data to improve driver’s experience.

Savings
In February 2012, RCI Banque launched the ZESTO savings accounts, which were opened to a general clientele. This internet-based operation was the first of its type by an automaker's subsidiary in France. The launch was accompanied by a TV commercial from Romain Kunstlinger. The success of this initiative led to other automotive groups operating in the French market, as PSA Peugeot Citroën, to consider launching similar projects. At the end of 2012, RCI Banque announced plans to extend ZESTO to Germany. The German version of ZESTO was launched in 2013, called RCI Bank Direkt. In January 2014, ZESTO-Bank Direkt had over 136,000 customers.

RCI Bank and Services launched its deposit collection business in Spain in November 2020. At end-December 2020, net collected deposits totaled €20.5 billion, or 43% of the company's assets. Deposits from retail customers in France, Germany, Austria, the United Kingdom, Brazil and Spain (savings books and term deposits) reached 20.5 billion euros at the end of December 2020 compared with 17.7 billion € at the end of December 2019 and representing nearly 43% of net assets at the end of December 2020.

UK subsidiary
In June 2015, RCI Banque's British subsidiary, RCI Bank UK, based in Rickmansworth, launched a savings account system in the United Kingdom, becoming the first car manufacturer-related financial company to do so. 

In March 2019 it obtained a UK banking licence; in February 2017 it announced it had received more than £2.1billion of deposits from more than 60,000 savers in the UK since launching in June 2015.

In 2017, RCI Bank was awarded as the "Best No Notice Account Provider" by the Moneyfacts Group.

Management
, the company is managed through an Executive Committee and a Board of Directors. Positions are as follows: João Miguel Leandro is Chief Executive Office, and  Clotilde Delbos , Chairman of the Board).

Sponsorship
RCI Banque's Diac sponsored the Renault Sport-assisted R5s and Clios of the Société Diac team, which competed in some events of the World Rally Championship and the French Rally Championship during the late 1980s and early 1990s.

On 24 March 2010, Diac and Renault F1 signed a sponsorship agreement which lasted from the Australian to the Monaco Grand Prix of that year. In 2017, the firm announced a new deal with the Renault F1 team from the Malaysian Grand Prix onwards.

References

External links
Official RCI Banque Web Site
Official Renault Group Web Site

Financial services companies of France
Insurance companies of France
Leasing companies
Financial services companies established in 1974
Renault
1974 establishments in France
Banks under direct supervision of the European Central Bank
Banks of France